Paul Guldin (born Habakkuk Guldin; 12 June 1577 (Mels) – 3 November 1643 (Graz)) was a Swiss Jesuit mathematician and astronomer. He discovered the Guldinus theorem to determine the surface and the volume of a solid of revolution. (This theorem is also known as the Pappus–Guldinus theorem and Pappus's centroid theorem, attributed to Pappus of Alexandria.) Guldin was noted for his association with the German mathematician and astronomer Johannes Kepler. Guldin composed a critique of Cavalieri's method of Indivisibles.

Although of Jewish descent, his parents were Protestants and they brought Guldin up in that faith. He was a professor of mathematics in Graz and Vienna.

In Paolo Casati's astronomical work Terra machinis mota (1658), Casati imagines a dialogue among Guldin, Galileo, and Marin Mersenne on various intellectual problems of cosmology, geography, astronomy and geodesy.

See also
List of Roman Catholic scientist-clerics

Notes

1577 births
1643 deaths
17th-century Swiss astronomers
Swiss Jesuits
17th-century Swiss mathematicians
17th-century Jesuits
Swiss people of Jewish descent
Jesuit scientists